Cantil may refer to:

 Several different venomous snake species within the Agkistrodon genus
 Tani Cantil-Sakauye (born 1959), 28th Chief Justice of California
 Cantil, California, small town in the United States
 Cantil, an alternate name of the drug mepenzolate
 The Portuguese name of a certain type of wine bottle, more commonly known under its German name Bocksbeutel